The Mall of Louisiana is a mid-scale shopping mall in Baton Rouge, Louisiana, between I-10 and Bluebonnet Blvd. It is the largest mall in Louisiana and contains the third largest indoor carousel in the world. It is the only regional mall in Baton Rouge. The anchor stores are 2 Dillard's stores, Main Event Entertainment, JCPenney, and Macy's.

The Boulevard is an unenclosed area of the mall that opened in 2008. Retailers and eateries include: Apple Inc., Ann Taylor, Ann Taylor Loft, BJ's Brewhouse, Chico's, Soma Intimates, C&J Clark, L'Occitane en Provence, Jos. A. Bank, Pottery Barn, Select Comfort, Sephora, and Menchie's.

History
The mall was built and opened in 1997 and Original Anchors were Dillard’s, McRae's, Sears, JCPenney, and Maison Blanche. The mall was developed by Jim Wilson & Associates

The Maison Blanche store was short lived and closed a year later and was replaced by Parisian.

In 2003, Foley's opened at a former Parisian store, which closed in 2001.

In November 2005, Dillard's acquired the McRae's store at the mall from Belk.

On July 21, 2006, Rave Motion Pictures opened a 15-screen movie theater adjacent to the mall. In June 2013, the movie theater was acquired by AMC Theatres.

On September 9, 2006, Foley's rebranded as Macy's.

In 2008, an unenclosed area called The Boulevard and a 10-tenant power center were constructed as additions to the mall.

In 2015, Nordstrom Rack opened a 30,000 square foot store in the mall.

In March 2017, H. H. Gregg closed its store at the mall.

In November 2017, Smashburger announced plans to open a location in the mall.

In January 2018, Banana Republic and Gap Inc. closed stores in the mall.

In June 2018, Main Event Entertainment announced plans to open a location in the mall in the space formerly occupied by H. H. Gregg.

In November 2018, H&M announced plans to open a store in the former Gap locations.

On February 12, 2021, it was announced that Sears would be closing as part of a plan to close 32 stores nationwide. The store closed in May 2, 2021. This was the last Sears store in Louisiana. T-Mobile is coming soon.

A Blue Zoo aquarium opened on April 1st 2021. On Tuesday, July 6, 2021, a 12-foot-long Burmese python named Cara escaped from her enclosure there.  The search for her concluded when she was found inside the walls of the mall early in the morning on July 8th.

References

External links
Official site

1997 establishments in Louisiana
Brookfield Properties
Buildings and structures in Baton Rouge, Louisiana
Economy of Baton Rouge, Louisiana
Shopping malls established in 1997
Shopping malls in Louisiana
Tourist attractions in Baton Rouge, Louisiana